New York's 144th State Assembly district is one of the 150 districts in the New York State Assembly. It has been represented by Michael Norris since 2017.

Geography
District 144 contains portions of Erie and Niagara counties. Prior to the 2021 redistricting cycle, the district contained a portion of Orleans County.

Recent election results

2020

2018

References

144
Erie County, New York
Niagara County, New York